Pam Gems (1 August 1925 – 13 May 2011) was an English playwright. The author of numerous original plays, as well as of adaptations of works by European playwrights of the past, Gems is best known for the 1978 musical play Piaf.

Personal life
Iris Pamela Price was born in Bransgore, Hampshire, and had her first play – a tale of goblins and elves – staged when she was eight by her fellow pupils at primary school.
She studied psychology at Manchester University from which she graduated in 1949. She was in her forties when she started to write professionally. She is best known for her 1978 musical play Piaf about French singer Édith Piaf.

She was nominated for two Tony Awards: for Stanley (Best Play) in 1997, and for Marlene (Best Book of a Musical), starring Siân Phillips as Marlene Dietrich, in 1999. Gems adapted works by dramatists ranging from Henrik Ibsen, Federico García Lorca and Anton Chekhov to Marguerite Duras.

Family
She married wax model manufacturer (the family firm, Gems Wax Models, established in 1885, has supplied models to Madame Tussauds) and former architect Keith Gems; the couple had four children.

Filmography

List of works

Early plays (1972–1976)

(work, year, place first produced)
 Betty's Wonderful Christmas (1972), Cockpit Theatre, London
 My Warren And After Birthday (1973), Almost Free Theatre, London
 Miz Venus and Wild Bill (1973), Almost Free Theatre, London
 After Birthday (1973)
 The Amiable Courtship Of Miz Venus And Wild Bill (1974), Almost Free Theatre, London
 Go West Young Woman (1974), The Roundhouse, London
 Up In Sweden (1975), Haymarket, Leicester
 My Name Is Rosa Luxembourg (adaptation), (1975)
 Up In Sweden (1975)
 Rivers and Forests (adaptation), (1976)
 Dead Fish (aka Dusa, Fish, Stas And Vi, 1976), Edinburgh Festival
 Guinevere (1976), Edinburgh Festival
 The Project (1976), Soho Poly, London

Middle plays (1977–2000)
 Franz Into April (1977), ICA, London
 Queen Christina (1977), Other Place, Stratford-on-Avon
 Piaf (1978), Other Place, Stratford-on-Avon
 Ladybird, Ladybird (1979), The King's Head, Islington, London
 Sandra (1979), London
 Aunt Mary (1982), Warehouse Theatre, London
 The Treat (1982), ICA, London
 The Cherry Orchard (adaptation) (1984)
 Variety Night (1982), London
 Camille (adaptation) (1984)
 Loving Women (1984)
 The Danton Affair (1986)
 Pasionaria (1985), Playhouse Theatre, Newcastle upon Tyne
 Arther and Guinevere (1990), Edinburgh
 The Seagull (adaptation) (1991)
 The Blue Angel (1991), Other Place, Stratford-on-Avon
 Deborah's Daughter (1994), Manchester
 Ghosts (adaptation) (1994)
 Marlene (1996), Oldham
 Stanley (1996), London
 At the Window (1997)
 The Snow Palace (1998)
 Ebba (1999)

Late plays (2000–2009)
 Girabaldi, Si! (2000)
 Linderhof (2001)
 Mrs Pat (2002), Theatre Royal, York
 Yerma  (adaptation) (2003), Royal Exchange Theatre Manchester
 Not Joan the Musical (2003)
 The Lady From The Sea (adaptation) (2003), Almeda Theatre London
 The Little Mermaid (adaptation) (2004), Greenwich Theatre, Riverside Theatre, London
 Nelson (2004), Nuffield Theatre, Southampton
 Broadway Lady (2007)
 Piaf (2008), Donmar Warehouse, London
 Winterlove (2009), The Drill Hall, London
 Despatches (2009), The Drill Hall, London

References

Further reading

External links

1925 births
2011 deaths
Alumni of the University of Manchester
People from New Forest District
Place of death missing
British women dramatists and playwrights
20th-century British dramatists and playwrights
20th-century British women writers